Rachel Gold is the author of Being Emily, the first young adult novel written from a transgender girl's point of view. Currently an award-winning marketing strategist and public speaker, Gold also spent a decade as a print reporter in the LGBT community. She earned a Bachelor of Arts in English and Religious Studies from Macalester College and a Master of Fine Arts in Writing from Hamline University.

Novels
 Being Emily (2012)
 Just Girls (2014)
 My Year Zero (2016)
 Nico & Tucker (2017)
 In the Silences (2019)

References

External links
Rachel Gold's official website

American young adult novelists
Macalester College alumni
Hamline University alumni
Living people
American women novelists
American lesbian writers
21st-century American novelists
American LGBT novelists
Transgender novelists
Women writers of young adult literature
21st-century American women writers
Year of birth missing (living people)
American transgender writers